The 1922 Italian Grand Prix was a Grand Prix motor race held at Monza on 10 September 1922.

Classification

References

Italian Grand Prix
Italian Grand Prix, 1922
1922 in Italian motorsport